Darby is an unincorporated community in Teton County, in the U.S. state of Idaho.

History
A post office called Darby was established in 1900, and remained in operation until 1902. According to tradition, Darby was named after a pioneer settler.

Darby's population was 9 in 1960.

References

Unincorporated communities in Teton County, Idaho